In descriptive set theory and mathematical logic, Lusin's separation theorem states that if A and B are disjoint analytic subsets of Polish space, then there is a Borel set C in the space such that A ⊆ C and B ∩ C = ∅. It is named after Nikolai Luzin, who proved it in 1927.

The theorem can be generalized to show that for each sequence (An) of disjoint analytic sets there is a sequence (Bn) of disjoint Borel sets such that An ⊆ Bn for each n. 

An immediate consequence is Suslin's theorem, which states that if a set and its complement are both analytic, then the set is Borel.

Notes

References 

 ( for the European edition) 
.

Descriptive set theory
Theorems in the foundations of mathematics
Theorems in topology